Edward Coke, Viscount Coke (2 February 1719 – 31 August 1753), styled The Hon. Edward Coke from 1728 to 1744, was a British Member of Parliament. He represented Norfolk in Parliament from 1741 to 1747 and Harwich from 1747 to his death.

He was the only child and heir of Thomas Coke, 1st Earl of Leicester, and his wife Margaret Coke, 19th Baroness de Clifford.  The family estate was at Holkham Hall, Norfolk.

Marriage
He was married on 1 April 1747 to Lady Mary Campbell (6 February 1727 – 30 September 1811), the fifth and youngest daughter of the soldier and politician John Campbell, 2nd Duke of Argyll (1680–1743), and his second wife, Jane (c.1683–1767), a maid of honour to Queen Anne and Caroline, Princess of Wales. Their courtship had been strained, and in retaliation Edward left her alone on their wedding night and from then on virtually imprisoned her. She reacted by refusing to have sex with him. She never used the title Viscountess Coke.

Their families went to litigation, and eventually produced a settlement in 1750 whereby Lady Mary could live with her mother at Sudbrook but had to remain married to Edward until his death.

He died in 1753, when Mary was 26, predeceasing his father. They had no children and the earldom thus became extinct when his father died in 1759. His father's estate, including Holkham Hall, went instead to Edward's cousin. Lady Mary never remarried.

Ancestry

Sources
 https://web.archive.org/web/20120301185712/http://www.cracroftspeerage.co.uk/online/content/index1369.htm
 https://web.archive.org/web/20181006224549/http://www.leighrayment.com/commons/Ncommons2.htm
 https://web.archive.org/web/20091220042104/http://www.leighrayment.com/commons/Hcommons1.htm
 http://www.historyofparliamentonline.org/volume/1715-1754/member/coke-hon-edward-1719-53

1719 births
1753 deaths
Members of the Parliament of Great Britain for Harwich
Members of the Parliament of Great Britain for Norfolk
British MPs 1741–1747
British MPs 1747–1754
Heirs apparent who never acceded
Edward, Viscount Coke
British courtesy viscounts